The Altenburg is a castle that sits on the tallest of the seven hills of Bamberg, southern Germany, overlooking the town. It is located in Upper Franconia, a region in the state of Bavaria, and dates back to at least 1109.

History
The first mention of the Altenburg was in 1109, although it is likely that it was built on the spot of an earlier palisade castle.

It first served as what is known in German as a "Fliehburg". This is a castle that was not regularly inhabited, but served mainly for city defense as a place where local residents could flee to in times of danger.

In 1251, the Bamberg "Fürstbischöfe," the sovereign bishops of Bamberg, acquired the castle. From 1305 to 1553, it was the residence of the bishops.

In 1553, during the Second Margrave War, the army of Albert Alcibiades, Margrave of Brandenburg-Kulmbach, burned the castle down. Afterward the castle was used as a prison for a while.

In 1801, the Bamberg physician Adalbert Friedrich Marcus acquired the decaying castle and restored it from the ground up. The author E. T. A. Hoffmann, who was friends with Marcus, felt so drawn to the castle that he frequently stayed for a long time in one of the wall towers during the years 1808 to 1813.

The Altenburg Society
In 1818, a society for the maintenance of the Altenburg, named the "Altenburgverein e.V. Bamberg," received the castle. The society was founded by Anton von Grafenstein, the postmaster of Bamberg.

Today the castle is open for public tours. There is also a restaurant in the castle called the "Restaurant Altenburg." The restaurant also manages the so-called Knights Hall, used mostly for events such as weddings or other celebrations.

From 1952 to 1982, a brown bear named Poldi lived in a Zwinger (a defensive enclosure) in the castle. The Zwinger is still present, but today only houses a stuffed bear.

Photo gallery

References

External links

 Altenburgverein 
 Restaurant Altenburg

Castles in Bavaria
Buildings and structures in Bamberg